"Vande Mataram" is the official national song of India and the origin of the patriotic cry of the Indian independence movement.

Vande Mataram or Bande Mataram may also refer to:

 Vande Mataram (album), patriotic studio album by Indian composer A.R.Rahman
 Bande Mataram (publication), English language newspaper founded in India in 1905 (published first in 1906) by Bipin Chandra Pal and later edited by Sri Aurobindo
 Bande Mataram (Paris publication), Indian nationalist publication published in Paris begun in September 1909 by Bhikaji Cama
 Vandae Maatharam, bilingual Indian film starring Mammootty
 Vande Mataram (1939 film), an Indian Telugu-language film
 Vande Mataram (1985 film), a 1985 Telugu film directed by T.Krishna
 Vande Matharam (2001 film), a 2001 Kannada film directed by Om Prakash Rao